Setastine (Loderix) is an antihistamine used to treat allergies and rhinitis.

Pharmacology

Pharmacodynamics 

Setastine acts as a highly selective H1 receptor antagonist. It has no anticholinergic, antiadrenergic, or antiserotonergic effects.

Pharmacokinetics 

Setastine penetrates the blood-brain-barrier poorly so it is only mildly sedating compared to related molecules like diphenhydramine.

See also 
 Clemastine

References 

H1 receptor antagonists
Chlorobenzenes
Ethers
Azepanes
Peripherally selective drugs